Nikolay Chavdarov (born 22 April 1976 in Pernik) is a retired Bulgarian football player who played as a goalkeeper.

References

Living people
1976 births
Bulgarian footballers
Association football goalkeepers
F.C. Metalurg Pernik players
PFC Rilski Sportist Samokov players
PFC Marek Dupnitsa players
PFC Pirin Blagoevgrad players
Akademik Sofia players
First Professional Football League (Bulgaria) players
Sportspeople from Pernik